Dotun Popoola (born in 1981, Lagos) is a contemporary Nigerian artist (sculptor) who specializes in synergetic metal sculpting. He creates pieces of art works from discarded scrap metals. His works are focused on transforming trash to treasures, rubbish to rubies and waste to wealth by repurposing wastes that threaten the ecosystem.

Early life 
Dotun studied painting and general arts in Auchi Polytechnic, Auchi, Edo State where he holds national diploma in painting and general art in 2004. He thereafter went to Obafemi Awolowo University, where he obtained his first and second degree in fine and applied arts with a specialisation in sculpture and painting respectively. Dotun is a resident artist in Lopez Studio in Lemmon, South Dakota, and travels between United States and Nigeria to paint commissioned murals. He was a curator at the National Gallery of Art.

Exhibitions, works and contributions
Popoola works primarily with scrap metal, where creating animal forms is his favourite way to use the medium. Some of his works were exhibited in ART X Lagos. He had a solo exhibition called "Irin Ajo" (Journey) in Signature Beyond Art Gallery, Lagos, where he presented around 24 metal works of his.

References

External links

 Works (Artsy)

Nigerian sculptors
1981 births
Living people
Auchi Polytechnic alumni
Artists from Lagos
Obafemi Awolowo University alumni